Holercani is a village in Dubăsari District, in the eastern-central part of the Republic of Moldova.

Geography
It is located on the bank of the biggest river of the country, Dniester (Nistru).

With the construction of the Dubasari dam in 1954, an artificial sea was formed, which spread over an area of 6,750 ha and has a length of 128 km with an average depth of 7.5 m. The old hearth of the village went under water, the church on the hill once stood on the shore of the reservoir. Below Holercani, in a wooded area with a huge park, is a spa town with good-looking parliamentary villas, a beach and a boat station.

History 
The village of Holercani is attested on January 26, 1466. The locality is presented on the maps from the 15th century. 18. Bowr's map from 1770 (1774) fixes it as the main settlement on the Dniester, with a place for the deployment of Russian armies during the Russo-Turkish war of 1768-1774. only 20 yards, the village estate belonging to the Monastery “St. Sava ”from Iaşi. According to data from the second half of the 19th century, the village had: in 1870-192 houses, 951 inhabitants (481 men and 470 women), 75 horses, 280 large horned cattle, 477 sheep and goats. From 1904: "Holercani village in Orhei county, located on the bank of the Dniester". It has 247 houses, with a population of 1860 souls; a church dedicated to St. Michael; Russian elementary school.

Demographics
At the 2014 census, the population of the village was 2271 inhabitants. At the 1930 census, the population of the village was 1,819, of which 1,799 Romanians, 14 Jews (all with Yiddish as native language), 4 Hungarians, 1 German, and 1 Russian. At the time Holercani was part of the Plasa Mașcăuți of Orhei County.

Notable people
 Vitalie Marinuța

References

Villages of Dubăsari District
Populated places on the Dniester